Pieter Aren Grinwis (born 12 October 1979) is a Dutch politician, who has been serving as a member of the House of Representatives on behalf of the Christian Union since March 2021. He previously served as a municipal councilor in The Hague and assisted the party in the House of Representatives and the Senate.

Early life and education 
Grinwis was born in 1979 in Ouddorp in South Holland as the son of an arable farmer, and he also grew up in that village. He attended the Middelharnis secondary school CSG Prins Maurits at  level. Grinwis subsequently studied economics of agriculture and environment at Wageningen University and Research, but he did not finish his program due to an illness and a scooter accident. He was a member of the Reformed Political Party (SGP) and of the Christian student organization C.S.F.R. He has told that he ended up at the Christian Union due to senator and philosopher Egbert Schuurman, one of his professors in university.

Grinwis received a degree in public administration from Leiden University in 2020.

Career 
Starting in October 2002, he interned at the Christian Union's scientific institute and its European Parliament caucus. He replaced a staff worker, who was on parental leave, the following year and got a permanent position as policy officer of the House caucus in 2004. He served as the political assistant to state secretary and minister Tineke Huizinga starting in 2007. Besides, he was on Christian Union's 2006 election program committee, and he would later also help write the programs for the general elections in 2010, 2012, 2017, and 2021. In 2010, he became a political and financial–economic advisor of Wim Kuijken, the commissioner of the Delta Programme, which aims to prevent flooding. Grinwis had been involved in the creation of the governmental cooperation as Huizinga's assistant and continued working there until 2015.

Municipal councilor (2014–2021) 
Both parties had a history of cooperating in The Hague municipal politics with the exception of the previous election, when neither party won any seats in the council. During the campaign, Grinwis advocated curbing prostitution in the city by introducing a ban on procuring. He was elected and was installed on 27 March. While in the municipal council, Grinwis also worked as a financial advisor for the Christian Union caucus in the House of Representatives and the Senate. Grinwis introduced over 65 motions and amendments that passed during his first term, more than any other councilor in The Hague in the same years. In the 2017 election, he ran for MP, appearing on the 14th place of the Christian Union's party list. His party won five seats, while Grinwis received 269 preferential votes – not enough to be elected. He served as a negotiator of the Christian Union concerned with financial policy during the government formation. In that position, he found a way to prevent health insurance deductibles from having to increase despite European regulations by raising premiums.

He favored leaving the Rotterdam–The Hague metropolitan area partnership, calling it undemocratic. The council banned the sale of laughing gas on the streets in 2020, a year after Grinwis had first proposed it.

House of Representatives (2021–present) 
In the 2021 general election, Grinwis appeared on the Christian Union's party list as the fifth candidate. He designed a new tax system for the campaign, calling the current one "hopelessly unjust, complex, and individualistic". He said that the current system was focused too much on stimulating people to do paid work. To make the system less complicated, he proposed abolishing allowances, exemptions, and most deductions, and – to compensate for this – he proposed instituting a single tax deduction for households, lowering income tax, and raising the minimum wage, the state pension, and the municipal welfare by 10%. Furthermore, under the plan, corporate taxes would be increased.

Grinwis was sworn into the House on 31 March after having been elected with 1,240 preference votes. He is a member of the Committees for Agriculture, Nature and Food Quality,  for Economic Affairs and Climate Policy, for Finance, and for Infrastructure and Water Management, and he serves as his party's spokesperson for agriculture, nature, food quality, finances, climate, energy, water management, housing, and spatial planning (formerly also economic affairs and infrastucture). Grinwis vacated his seat in The Hague municipal council on 15 April. He was his party's  in The Hague in the 2022 municipal elections.

He was involved in the creation of a €514 million national insulation program to make buildings more sustainable. In anticipation to the program, Grinwis presented together with the CDA and GroenLinks a twelve-point manifesto, which included making subsidies attractive to lower-income households and which had to be considered in the drafting of the actual program according to a passed motion. In the House, Grinwis also proposed for policy officers of the Ministry of Agriculture, Nature and Food Quality to be encouraged to intern at farms, nature organizations, and the NVWA, and he unsuccessfully called for a halt to the construction of new data centers due to their footprint and energy usage, when one in Zeewolde for Facebook was nearing approval. He brought forward a compromise in May 2022 when D66 and GroenLinks wanted to abolish unelected members of water councils through an initiative bill. Grinwis's amendment was carried to remove the unelected member of daily management and to fix the unelected water council members to two representing farmers and two representing nature organizations, thereby getting rid of company representatives. The bill subsequently passed the House. In September 2022, Grinwis announced an initiative bill with Henk Nijboer (Labour Party) to prohibit temporary rental contracts to protect renters. They had been allowed since 2015 to increase the stock of renting houses and accounted for one third of new contracts. Grinwis shortly after proposed a new tax on online shopping deliveries due to their greenhouse gas emissions and the nuisance caused by delivery vans. The money raised would be invested in small and medium-sized enterprises.

Personal life 
Grinwis lives in The Hague, and he has a wife called Suzanne and four children.

References 

1979 births
Living people
21st-century Dutch politicians
Christian Union (Netherlands) politicians
Members of the House of Representatives (Netherlands)
Municipal councillors of The Hague
People from Goeree-Overflakkee
Political staffers
Leiden University alumni
Wageningen University and Research alumni